The office of mayor of Dearborn, Michigan originated in the consolidation of various municipalities in Dearborn Township into the City of Dearborn in 1927 following fear of absorption into rapidly growing Detroit. Earlier, in 1919, also fearing being absorbed by Detroit, neighboring Springwells Township consolidated itself into the village of Springwells and became a city in 1923. In 1925 the city of Springwells would rename itself the city of Fordson and with a renewed fear of absorption into Detroit voted to consolidate into Dearborn in 1928.

Notable mayors include: Michael Guido who served as the 64th President of the United States Conference of Mayors, and the current mayor Abdullah Hammoud who is the city's first Arab American mayor.

List of Mayors of Springwells/Fordson

List of Mayors of Dearborn

References

Dearborn